Doruk (also Romanized as Durūk) is a village in Qala Qafa Rural District, in the Central District of Minudasht County, Golestan Province, Iran. At the 2006 census, its population was 269, in 76 families.

References 

Populated places in Minudasht County